Invitation is the third album by Jaco Pastorius, released in December 1983. This is a live album recorded at various venues during a tour of Japan in September 1982, featuring his "Word of Mouth" big band. While his debut album showcased his eclectic and impressive skills on the electric bass, both Invitation and his previous album, Word of Mouth focused more on his ability to arrange for a larger band.

This album features mostly numbers written by other artists. The exceptions are new arrangements of "Continuum", from his debut album, and "Liberty City", from Word of Mouth, as well as "Reza", an original number bookending his version of John Coltrane's "Giant Steps".

The band's all-star cast included Randy Brecker, Bob Mintzer, Toots Thielemans, Peter Erskine, Othello Molineaux, and Don Alias.

Track listing 

"Invitation" (Bronisław Kaper) – 6:57
"Amerika" (Traditional) – 1:09
"Soul Intro/The Chicken" (Jaco Pastorius/Pee Wee Ellis) – 6:49
"Continuum" (Jaco Pastorius) – 4:28
"Liberty City" (Jaco Pastorius) – 4:35
"Sophisticated Lady" (Duke Ellington, Irving Mills, Mitchell Parish) – 5:17
"Reza/Giant Steps/Reza (Reprise)" (Jaco Pastorius/John Coltrane) – 10:23
"Fannie Mae" (Buster Brown, Clarence Lewis, Morgan Robinson) – 2:38
"Eleven" (Miles Davis, Gil Evans) – 0:49

Personnel 

 Jaco Pastorius — electric bass
 Don Alias – percussion
 Randy Brecker – trumpet
 Peter Erskine – drums
 Bob Mintzer – tenor and soprano saxophone
 Othello Molineaux – steel drum
 Jean "Toots" Thielemans – harmonica (listed as a "special guest")

Also featuring:

 Elmer Brown, Forrest Buchtel, Ron Tooley – trumpet
 Jon Faddis – trumpet (solo on "Reza")
 Wayne Andre – trombone
 Dave Bargeron – trombone, tuba
 Peter Graves – bass trombone, co–conductor
 Bill Reichenbach – bass trombone
 Mario Cruz – tenor and soprano saxophone, clarinet, alto flute
 Randy Emerick – baritone saxophone, clarinet
 Alex Foster – tenor, alto and soprano saxophone, clarinet, piccolo
 Paul McCandless – tenor saxophone, oboe, English horn
 Peter Gordon, Brad Warnaar – French horn

See also 

 Jaco Pastorius discography

References

External links 

 Official Jaco Site
 Family Tribute Site

Jaco Pastorius albums
1983 live albums
Warner Records live albums